George Gribbon Sutcliffe  (2 February 189510 December 1964) was a senior Australian public servant, best known for his time as a Commissioner of the Commonwealth Public Service Board.

Life and career
Sutcliffe was born in Coburg, Melbourne on 2 February 1895 to parents Mary Sutcliffe (née Perryman) and John Sutcliffe. He joined the Commonwealth Public Service in the Postmaster-General's Department at the age of 14.

Between April and December 1948, Sutcliffe was Secretary of the Department of Shipping and Fuel. He was then appointed a Commissioner of the Public Service Board, and moved to Canberra.

He retired from the Public Service Board in 1960, and was appointed Commonwealth Coordinator of the Good Neighbour movement.

Sutcliffe died of a coronary occlusion on 10 December 1964 in Goulburn, New South Wales, where he was attending a meeting of the council of the Diocese of Canberra and Goulburn. He was buried in Canberra cemetery.

Awards
Sutcliffe was appointed a Commander of the Order of the British Empire in the 1956 Queen's Birthday Honours for his public service.

References

1895 births
1964 deaths
Australian public servants
Australian Commanders of the Order of the British Empire